Yellow Patch may refer to:

The yellow badge
Colotis halimede, a butterfly in the genus Colotis
Yellow Patch Light, a former lighthouse on Moreton Island, Australia
Yellow Patch, a 2011 film by the Ugandan Asian artist Zarina Bhimji